There are Unicode typefaces which are open-source and designed to contain glyphs of all Unicode characters, or at least a broad selection of Unicode scripts. There are also numerous projects aimed at providing only a certain script, such as the Arabeyes Arabic font. The advantage of targeting only some scripts with a font was that certain Unicode characters should be rendered differently depending on which language they are used in, and that a font that only includes the characters a certain user needs will be much smaller in file size compared to one with many glyphs. Unicode fonts in modern formats such as OpenType can in theory cover multiple languages by including multiple glyphs per character, though very few actually cover more than one language's forms of the unified Han characters.

History

GNU Unifont

GNU Unifont is a bitmap-based font created by Roman Czyborra that is present in most free operating systems and windowing systems such as Linux, XFree86 or the X.Org Server. The font is released under the GNU General Public License Version 2+ with a font embedding exception.

Fixed

The Fixed X11 public-domain core bitmap fonts have provided substantial Unicode coverage since 1997.

21st century

2000s

Free UCS Outline Fonts

The Free UCS Outline Fonts (also known as freefont) is a font collection project. The project was started by Primož Peterlin and is currently administered by Steve White. The aim of this project has been to produce a package of fonts by collecting existing free fonts and special donations, to support as many Unicode characters as possible. The font family is released as GNU FreeFont under the GNU General Public License. It also supports several font formats, including PostScript, TrueType, and OpenType. For this reason the fonts are derived from original work made in FontForge, and stored in .sfd (Spline Font Database) files. The most recent release is from May 2012.

SIL fonts
SIL International offers a large number of fonts, editors, translation and book production systems as part of their goal to bridge the digital divide to minority languages. This site contains many utilities for Windows systems, including right-to-left editors, keymappers, RTF translators, and high-quality, free Unicode fonts.
SIL publish their fonts under their own SIL Open Font License. Typefaces include Charis SIL, Doulos SIL, Gentium and Andika.

MPH 2B Damase
Mark Williamson's MPH 2B Damase is a free font encoding many non-Latin scripts, including the Unicode 4.1 scripts in the Supplementary Multilingual Plane:
Armenian, Cherokee, Coptic, Cypriot Syllabary, Cyrillic, Deseret, Georgian, Glagolitic, Gothic, Greek, Hebrew, Latin, Limbu, Linear B (partial coverage), Old Italic, Old Persian cuneiform, Osmanya, Phoenician, Shavian, Syloti Nagri (no conjuncts), Tai Le (no combining tone marks), Thaana, Tifinagh, Ugaritic, and Vietnamese.

IndUni fonts
The IndUni fonts are a GPL-licensed font family with many accents and combining characters, especially suitable for Indic, Indian and Nepali (Sanskrit, Prakrit, Hindi) and Middle Eastern languages and Urdu in transliteration. It also includes characters for Avestan and for the Pinyin representation of Chinese, a set of Cyrillic characters and a basic set of Greek letters. The fonts implement almost the whole of the Multilingual European Subset 1 of Unicode. Also provided are keyboard handlers for Windows and the Mac, making input easy.

They are based on fonts designed by URW++ Design and Development Incorporated, and offer lookalikes for Courier, Helvetica, Times, Palatino, and New Century Schoolbook.

2010s

Noto fonts 

Noto is a font family designed to cover all the scripts encoded in the Unicode standard. It is designed with the goal of achieving visual harmony (e.g., compatible heights and stroke thicknesses) across multiple languages/scripts. Commissioned by Google, the font is licensed under the SIL Open Font License. Until September 2015, the fonts were under the Apache License 2.0.

Cascadia Code 

Cascadia Code is a purpose-built monospaced TrueType font for Windows Terminal, the new command-line interface for Microsoft Windows. It includes programming ligatures and was designed to enhance the look and feel of Windows Terminal, terminal applications and text editors such as Visual Studio and Visual Studio Code. The font is open source under the SIL Open Font License and available on GitHub. It has been bundled with Windows Terminal since version 0.5.2762.0.

2020s

Kurinto Font Folio
Kurinto is a large collection of Pan-Unicode, OFL-licensed fonts. The intended use-case is academic publishing, especially when authoring in Microsoft Word and publishing to PDF. None of the italic faces are true italics; they are simply sloped versions of the corresponding faces. The primary goal is to address issues when mixing languages using Latin script with secondary languages using other scripts.

Larabie Fonts
In August 2020, Ray Larabie released a library of early fonts from the 1990s, prior to the establishment of his professional digital type firm Typodermic Fonts, into the public domain. Most of the fonts that were released were "experimental interesting (or) simply lousy" and were no longer of any commercial value. (Larabie retained copyright on other fonts from the same era that he continues to license and sell through Typodermic.) Larabie released another batch of fonts into the public domain in November 2022. The fonts vary widely in their Unicode coverage.

Larabie had previously released the pan-Unicode "Canada 1500" into the public domain as a gesture to the Canadian sesquicentennial in 2017.

Comparison

See also 

 List of typefaces
 Unicode font
 List of CJK fonts

References

External links
 Google Font Directory
Unicode Font Guide For Free/Libre Open Source Operating Systems, a huge index of high quality free fonts
SIL's freeware fonts, editors and documentation
GNU Unifont
Unicode FAQ for UNIX systems
Unicode fonts and tools for X11
Free Font Compilation made from the Debian GNU/Linux distribution. The fonts can be downloaded individually or as a complete package ready with installers for Mac OS X or Microsoft Windows

 
Lists of typefaces